Poa Bun Sreu is a Cambodian politician. He belongs to Funcinpec and was elected to represent Kampong Thom Province in the National Assembly of Cambodia in 2003.

References

FUNCINPEC politicians
Members of the National Assembly (Cambodia)
Living people
Year of birth missing (living people)